The Chiltern Firehouse is a restaurant and hotel located at 1 Chiltern Street, Marylebone, London, England occupying the Grade II listed building of the former Marylebone Fire Station, also known as Manchester Square Fire Station. It is owned by André Balazs, a hotel chain owner, who also owns the Chateau Marmont in Los Angeles, California. The head chef is Nuno Mendes.

Manchester Square Fire Station

The Manchester Square Fire Station was built in 1889, by the London County Council Architect's Department, "in the Vulliamy manner". "Red brick with stone dressings; tiled roof. Free Tudor-Gothic style". It initially served as a fire station, and was one of the first fire stations in London. The original architect was Robert Pearsall. Originally known as Manchester Square Fire Station (Manchester Square is nearby), it was decommissioned in June 2005 by the London Fire and Emergency Planning Authority. For some years subsequently, it had been in occasional use as an exhibition space for local artists, as there was a long and complex planning process to convert it to a luxury hotel and restaurant. David Archer of Archer Humphryes Architects acted as lead architect for the project.

Chiltern Firehouse hotel and restaurant
The Chiltern Firehouse opened as a 26-suite hotel and 200 capacity restaurant in 2013. It is the first British establishment by American hotelier André Balazs.

Interior
The Firehouse features an open kitchen. The restaurant interior is designed by Paris-based Studio KO. The Independent'''s restaurant critic Tracey MacLeod described the interior by saying that "they've kept the huge firehouse doors, giving an almost rustic feel, while cleverly-placed mirrors create the illusion of infinite space." Londonist reported: The look of the space is unique. A ceiling clad with fabric that would feel at home on the seats of the Bakerloo line, carpeted corridors your gran would like, and a scattering of pot plants and nic-nacs lend a feel that's simultaneously homely and nothing at all like a home you could imagine. Grace Dent of the London Evening Standard described a "glorious dining room that is part classic French brasserie, part industrial—supporting pillars, a fireman's pole and low-hanging lights—and part chintzy in-joke with pot plants, ornaments, thick hallway carpets and marble tables."

Chef and cuisine

The Chiltern Firehouse's head chef is the Portuguese Nuno Mendes. Mendes was trained at the California Culinary Academy in the 1990s, worked at elBulli, and has worked with Wolfgang Puck, Rocco di Spirito, and Jean-Georges Vongerichten. In 2006, Mendes opened Bacchus, a gastropub in Hoxton, and later opened The Loft Project, from his own apartment in Shoreditch, "where some of the best chefs cooked in front of guests, offering a pioneering and intimate experience". In 2010, Mendes opened Viajante (Portuguese for "traveller") in Bethnal Green's Town Hall Hotel, inspired by world cuisines. Within its first year of opening it received a Michelin star and was included in the 2013 World's 50 Best Restaurants. Giles Coren of The Times referred to Mendes as "every restaurant critic's secret favourite cook". Also working in the kitchen is Dale Osborne previously at Dinner by Heston Blumenthal.

Food hygiene failingsThe Times reported in August 2014 that officers from Westminster City Council's food safety team had awarded the restaurant only two stars out of a possible five when the restaurant was inspected. Inspectors had found dirty surfaces, food served below safe temperatures, dirty fly screens, poor access to hot water and soap, and broken glass in a freezer. A former chef who spoke to The Times said: "Upstairs the diners could see the chefs working away in the open-plan kitchen, but downstairs it was a different story ... We had people using an ironing board to chop herbs on and there was no extraction". The article was accompanied by a photograph of a chef using an ironing board to prepare food. The Chiltern Firehouse commented that the "vast majority" of the problems had been rectified.Celebs' haunt Chiltern Firehouse given two stars out of five by food hygiene inspectors Alexandra Rucki, London Evening Standard, 4 August 2014. Retrieved 7 August 2014.

Celebrity patronage and criticism
In June 2014, The Daily Telegraph called it "London's hottest celebrity hangout", saying: "Once upon a time, celebrities liked to nibble their lettuce leaves at The Ivy. Then, the place to go for your sushi (and a quick romp in the broom cupboard) was Nobu. These days, it's the Chiltern Firehouse".

The Daily Mirror noted the Firehouse's exclusive reputation, asking: "Fancy booking a table at Chiltern Firehouse? Well unless your name is written on the Hollywood Walk of Fame then you may as well give up!" The Daily Telegraph reported a "rigorous screening process to accept bookings", saying: "Chiltern Firehouse is all about who's who and with the amount of detail gone into creating what has to be one of the loveliest and coolest new places in London, it's almost justified." MacLeod appeared critical of the exclusivity of the Firehouse, writing: The garage, once home to the fire engines, now revs with the self-congratulatory hum of a fashionable crowd, who have scored a table despite a bookings policy apparently borrowed from the North Korean tourist board. [...] Appropriate perhaps, that in keeping with its previous incarnation, the Firehouse seems to operate a strict no-civilians policy. Britta Jaschinski of Time Out said: "Checking in feels a bit like arriving at a Scientology meeting." Bryony Gordon blogged that "there is even a waiting list for the waiting list".

The food, however, has not been universally praised, with Matthew Norman of The Daily Telegraph'' writing that the:cooking ranges from the merely comforting to the plainly inedible; and which, despite the unstinting efforts of its publicists at Freud Communications to festoon newspaper pages with tidings of its stellar clientele, barely qualifies as the best restaurant on its own premises.

References

External links
 

Grade II listed buildings in the City of Westminster
Grade II listed government buildings
Fire stations completed in 1889
Restaurants in London
Buildings by Robert Pearsall
Defunct fire stations
Fire stations in the United Kingdom
Buildings and structures in Marylebone